Jonathan Carter may refer to:

 Jonathan Carter (American football) (born 1979), American football wide receiver
 Jonathan Carter (cricketer) (born 1987), cricketer who plays for Barbados
 Jonathan Carter (politician), American politician in Maine
 Jonathan H. Carter (1821–1884), North Carolina-born planter, sailor, and Confederate States of America gunboat builder
 Jonathan Carter (athlete) (born 1972), American former sprinter
 Jonathan Carter, the 2020 Debian Project Leader.

See also
 John Carter (disambiguation)